CTNE may refer to:
Compañía Telefónica Nacional de España
Club Telex Noise Ensemble